The Rockford Airfest was a two-day air show that happened every year at Chicago Rockford International Airport located in Rockford, Illinois, USA. Approximately 130,000 people attended the 2012 event.

On December 16, 2016, it was announced via the event's website that the Rockford Airfest would be canceled for 2017 and would not run in future years. The website post cited major ongoing development at Chicago Rockford International Airport as the main cause for the cancellations.

History
From 1986 to 1994, the Greater Rockford Airport (as it was known until 2003) hosted the Midwest AirFest, which twice featured the Air Force Thunderbirds.
The newly renamed airport began hosting the Rockford AirFest in 2005.  It was held again in 2006, and the Navy Blue Angels were featured in 2007. The F-22 Raptor Team performed in 2009. The 2010 AirFest once again hosted the USAF Thunderbirds on July 31 – Aug 1, 2010. The 2011 AirFest (June 4–5) commemorated the 100th anniversary of Naval Aviation. The U.S. Navy Blue Angels were slated as the headline performers, but their performance was canceled as part of the May 23 safety stand-down. The Black Diamond (formally known as the Heavy Metal Jet Team) replaced the Blues at the last minute to fill the Sunday show. Sponsored by United Bank Card, the Black Diamond Jet Team is a five-jet (L-39 Albatros, Canadair T-33) team based out of Lancaster, Pennsylvania.

Headline performers
2005: None
2006: USAF Thunderbirds
2007: US Navy Blue Angels
2008: USAF Thunderbirds
2009: USAF F-22 Raptor Demonstration Team
2010: USAF Thunderbirds
2011: US Navy Blue Angels (cancelled), Black Diamond Jet Team
2012: U.S. Air Force Thunderbirds
2013 (cancelled): U.S. Navy Blue Angels
2014: U.S. Air Force Thunderbirds, Snowbirds
2015: U.S. Navy Blue Angels, F-22 Raptor Demo Team
2017: SHOW CANCELLED U.S. Air Force Thunderbirds

References

Air shows in the United States
Aviation in Illinois
Rockford, Illinois